Rhinella inca is a species of toad in the family Bufonidae that is endemic to Peru. Its natural habitats are subtropical or tropical moist montane forests, rivers, and canals and ditches.

References

Sources

inca
Amphibians of Peru
Amphibians of the Andes
Amphibians described in 1913
Endemic fauna of Peru
Taxonomy articles created by Polbot